Soudabeh Moradian (Persian:سودابه مرادیان) is an Iranian-American independent filmmaker. A number of her movies have been in official selection of various international film festivals and many of them won awards. She has made many documentary series about Iranian rural women, and some independent documentaries about "war and madness" such as "Doomsday Machine"," Story Of The Land On Ashes","Mahin", "Voices Against Them" and some other narrative and docufiction films and series like "The Leader of Caravan","My Name Is Tomorrow" and "Les Chroniques d'iran". She made her first full feature-length narrative called Polaris in 2014 in Los Angeles and Seattle starring Bahram Radan, Alicja Bachleda, Elisabeth Röhm and Coby Ryan McLaughlin. The subjects of her movies are mainly based on social issues, women and psychological impacts of war.

She's also been teaching at film schools and colleges such as the Art Institute of California, College of the Canyons, Columbia College Hollywood, etc. She is currently a film professor at Syracuse University, New York .

Life 

She was born in Tehran-Iran and started her career in directing, screen writing and editing in 1996 . She graduated from Tehran University of Art with a B.S in cinema in 1996 and got an MFA degree in Film and Video from California Institute of the Arts in 2015. She immigrated to the United States in 2009 and has been working as a screenwriter, director, editor and film professor in California and New York.

Films 
 Polaris - Feature - 2017
 Writing and Directing
 -2020 Reframe Stamp Recipient 
 -Won the best feature at Culver City Film Festival - Los Angeles 
 -Nominated for the best feature, best director and best actress at California Women's Film Festival - Los Angeles 
 I Was Born Yesterday - Documentary - 2014
 Directing and Editing
 -Won the best documentary at Barcelona Planet Film Festival (Spain), European Film Festival (Russia), Spotlight Documentary Film Award (USA)
 - Official selection of: Los Angeles CineFest (USA), Sydney World Film festival (Australia), Roma Cinemadoc (Italy), Barcelona Planet film festival (Spain), Toronto film week (Canada), Lisbon International film festival (Portugal), Venice film week, Silent Movie World film festival (Ukraine)
 Burnt City - Experimental Documentary - 2012
 Directing and Editing
 With Iranian - Documentary series - 2010
 Screen writing, Directing and Editing
 Les Chroniques d'Iran- Documentary series for Arte TV - 2009
 Doomsday Machine (Machine Rooze Ghiamat) – Documentary - 2006~2009
 Screen writing, Directing and Editing
 - Official Selection of UKIFF Film Festival (London -2010)
 -Nominated in DOCSDF international Film Festival (Mexico-2009)
 -Official Selection of Document 7-international human rights film festival (Scotland-2009)
 -"a prize of honor"in Parivin Etesami Film Festival (Iran-2009)
 Outspoken : Los Angeles - Documentary - 2007
 Associate producer
 Voices Against Them - Documentary - 2007
 Producer, Co-Director and Editor
 The women of village (series 2)- documentary - 2002~2003
 Screen writing, Directing and Editing
 My name is tomorrow- fiction series - 2003
 Screen writing, Directing and Editing
 The savage sunflowers- feature - 2003
 Editing
 Story of the land on ashes (Gheseye khake soukhte)- documentary - 2001
 Screen writing, Directing and Editing
 - Official Selection of 20th Fajr International Film Festival- Iran, 18th international Short Film Festival- Iran and third week of FOROUGH Film- Iran
 Green and being in love- documentary series - 2001
 Screen writing, Directing and Editing
 Nexus – documentary series - 2000
 Screen writing and Directing
 MAHIN – Documentary - 1999
 Screen writing and Directing
 - Achieved the honorary Diploma in KISH Documentary Film Festival-Iran
 - Official Selection of Iranian films in North America and Achieved the honorary Diploma in Vancouver
 - Official Selection of festivals: Hamburg (Germany), Dresden (Germany), Ebenezer (Austria), Borne (Czech Republic)...
 Rain for surviving – documentary series - 1997
 Screen writing, Directing and Editing
 The women of village (series 1) – documentary series - 1997
 Screen writing, Directing and Editing
 Discovering Iran – Documentary parts of the Discovering Iran CD. - 1997
 Directing and Editing
 The leader of Caravan (Ghafeleh Salar)- short film - 1996
 Screen writing, Directing and Editing
 - Official Selection of Madrid Film Festival

Other Activities 
 Panelist for 2021 NYSCA/NYFA Artist Fellows (New York Foundation for the Arts) 
 Jury member for a number of film festivals such as 13th Los Angeles Greek Film Festival and Syracuse International Film Festival 2021
 Vice President of Iranian documentary filmmakers association IRDFA (2008–2009) 
 Executive manager of the First workshop on documentary film making by IRDFA (Iranian documentary filmmakers association) and DEFC (documentary and experimental film center) in Tehran, Iran
 Columnist and Film critic in newspapers and artistic foundations.
 Member of International Documentary Association(IDA), The D-Word and IRDFA

References

Sources
 Soudabeh Moradian in Iranian Documentary Filmmakers Association(IRDFA)
 Soudabeh Moradian in International Documentary Association(IDA)
 Soudabeh Moradian in The D-Word

External links 

 

1972 births
Iranian documentary filmmakers
Iranian film directors
Iranian film editors
Iranian emigrants to the United States
Iranian contemporary artists
Iranian women film directors
Living people
Women film editors
Women documentary filmmakers
Tehran University of Art alumni